The Vasuki Ganga River flows through Uttarakhand, India. It is a tributary of the Mandakini River.

The source of the Vasuki Ganga is the Vasuki Tal, a small glacial lake located in the glacial trough east of Chor Gamak glacier, near Kedarnath. vasuki river in rudraprayag .

sonprayag  - vasuki + mandakini

Overview 

There is mention of Vasuki river also known as Son river which is a small river and flows in downside of Kedarnath hills. Son is also known as Vasuki Ganga.:- Source:- Aitihasik Sthanavali (A book written by Vijayendra Kumar Mathur and published by Rajasthan Hindi Granth Akadami, Jaipur).  Confluence of the rivers Vasuki Ganga and Mandakini is known as Sonprayag/Vasukiprayag is situated at 14 kilometer distance from famous Triyuginarayan temple (site where Lord Shiva and Parvati got married together.).  Five kilometer pedestrian distance from here.
 
the place where this Vasukiprayag/Sonprayag is situated is known as Bhilangana region. there are so many prayagas in that area. source- shloka-23, chapter-44, Kedarakhanda, Skandapurana. confluence of two rivers that are called sangam in rest of the India, they are known as prayag in Uttarakhand, India.

References 

Rivers of Uttarakhand
Rivers of India